Ozmuş, Çamlıdere is a village in the District of Çamlıdere, Ankara Province, Turkey.

References

Villages in Çamlıdere District